The 1959 UMass Redmen football team represented the University of Massachusetts Amherst in the 1959 NCAA College Division football season as a member of the Yankee Conference. The team was coached by Charlie O'Rourke and played its home games at Alumni Field in Amherst, Massachusetts. The 1959 season was O'Rourke's last as coach of the Minutemen. UMass finished the season with a record of 3–5–1 overall and 2–2 in conference play.

Schedule

References

UMass
UMass Minutemen football seasons
Umass Redmen football